Gary Allan Sojka (born July 15, 1940) was president of Bucknell University from 1984 to 1995.

Biography
Sojka received his bachelor of arts degree from Coe College and his master of science and doctor of philosophy degrees from Purdue University. Sojka later became the president of the Pennsylvania Association of Colleges and Universities. Sojka holds honorary doctorates from Lycoming College, Purdue University and Bucknell University.  

Sojka was appointed to the Pennsylvania Gaming Control Board for a two-year term in January 2007 and was reappointed in 2009.

Sojka Pavilion, home of the Bucknell Bison basketball teams since its opening in 2003, was named in his honor.

References

External links
An Inaugural Celebration at Bucknell University – Gary Allan Sojka, The Thirteenth President

Purdue University alumni
1940 births
Living people
Members of American gaming commissions
Gambling in Pennsylvania
Presidents of Bucknell University